Carey Theological College is Baptist theological institute based in Vancouver, British Columbia. It is affiliated with the Canadian Baptists of Western Canada.

History
The Carey Theological College was founded in 1959 as Carey Hall by the Canadian Baptists of Western Canada.   It officially opened in 1960.  In 1991, it was renamed Carey Theological College.

Programs
Carey places an emphasis on applied theology, particularly preaching, missions, urban studies, evangelism, spiritual formation and equipping ministries.

References

External links 
 Carey Theological College

University of British Columbia
Universities and colleges in Vancouver
Colleges in British Columbia
University Endowment Lands
Baptist seminaries and theological colleges in Canada
Christianity in Vancouver